The 2018 Internazionali di Tennis Castel del Monte was a professional tennis tournament played on indoor carpet courts. It was the sixth edition of the tournament which was part of the 2018 ATP Challenger Tour. It took place in Andria, Italy between November 19 and November 25, 2018.

Singles main-draw entrants

Seeds

 1 Rankings are as of 12 November 2018.

Other entrants
The following players received wildcards into the singles main draw:
  Liam Caruana
  Julian Ocleppo
  Andrea Pellegrino
  Jannik Sinner

The following player received entry into the singles main draw as an alternate:
  Alessandro Bega

The following players received entry from the qualifying draw:
  Lorenzo Frigerio
  Illya Marchenko
  Aldin Šetkić
  Tobias Simon

The following players received entry as lucky losers:
  Alexander Erler
  Marc-Andrea Hüsler

Champions

Singles

 Ugo Humbert def.  Filippo Baldi 6–4, 7–6(7–3).

Doubles

 Karol Drzewiecki /  Szymon Walków def.  Marc-Andrea Hüsler /  David Pel 7–6(12–10), 2–6, [11–9].

References

2018 ATP Challenger Tour
2018
2018 in Italian tennis